The 2020 FC Tulsa season was the franchise's 6th season in the USL Championship, the second-tier professional soccer league in the United States and Canada. It was their first season since the club's rebranding from Tulsa Roughnecks to FC Tulsa.

Club

Competitions

Exhibitions

USL Championship

Standings — Group D

Match results

USL Championship Playoffs

U.S. Open Cup 

As a USL Championship club, the FC Tulsa were to begin play by April 7–9.  However, the tournament was suspended and eventually cancelled due to the COVID-19 pandemic.

References

Tulsa Roughnecks
FC Tulsa
FC Tulsa
FC Tulsa